Merced (Spanish for "Mercy") is a city in, and the county seat of, Merced County, California, United States, in the San Joaquin Valley. As of the 2020 Census, the city had a population of 86,333, up from 78,958 in 2010. Incorporated on April 1, 1889, Merced is a charter city that operates under a council–manager government. It is named after the Merced River, which flows nearby.

Merced, known as the "Gateway to Yosemite", is less than two hours by automobile from Yosemite National Park to the east and Monterey Bay, the Pacific Ocean, and multiple beaches to the west. The community is served by the passenger rail service Amtrak, a minor, heavily subsidized airline through Merced Regional Airport, and three bus lines.

In 2005, the city became home to the 10th University of California campus, University of California, Merced (UC Merced), the first research university built in the U.S. in the 21st century.

History 

The first Merced post office opened in 1870. Merced incorporated in 1889 and now operates under the council-manager form of government.

During World War II, the Merced County fairgrounds were the site of a temporary "assembly center" where Japanese Americans were detained after being removed from their West Coast homes under Executive Order 9066. 4,669 men, women and children from central California (with most coming from Merced County) were confined in the Merced Assembly Center from May 6 to September 15, 1942, when they were transferred to the more permanent Granada internment camp in Colorado.

Since 2005, Merced has been home to the University of California, Merced. Current recreational opportunities in the city include Regal Cinemas, Oh Wow Nickel Arcade, Rollerland, The Castle Air Museum, a zoo, a skate park and basketball court in Applegate park, The Mainzer Theater which is known for its historic and architectural value, the County Courthouse Museum circa 1889, the Merced Multicultural Arts Center and the County Library. Merced has several shopping areas including the Merced Mall, anchored by Target, JCPenney and Kohl's, a strip mall located on the city's northwest side which includes Barnes & Noble, Lowe's, Walmart, and a few restaurants. Merced's Main Street contains a movie theater, a music store, a shoe cobbler and other assorted shops.

Also within a short distance from the city limits are the Castle Air Museum, Lake Yosemite, and Merced Falls. The city of Merced along with its surrounding cities are serviced by the Merced Sun-Star and the Merced County Times. The Merced Sun-Star daily newspaper has a circulation of 14,219 daily and 18,569 Saturday in the Merced area. The paper was sold to U.S. Media in 1985 and was acquired by The McClatchy Company in January 2004:Single-Copy Sales: 2,522 daily and 2,952 Saturday.

Homes at the median level in Merced had lost 62% of their value from the second quarter of 2006, when they peaked at $336,743, the biggest drop anywhere in the country, according to data provided to Forbes by Local Market Monitor, a Cary, North-Carolina-based real-estate research firm. Home prices have since rebounded, with the median sale price in April 2018 at $247,000. The current average being $358,000. Terry Ruscoe of Merced-Yosemite Realty, noted investors from outside of the Valley were helping to drive up home prices. Ruscoe said, "A tremendous amount of out-of-town buyers. Our primary client comes from the LA area or the Bay Area. We see a lot of them coming in and buying properties, even coming in now when the prices are moving up quickly because they know they can rent those."

The metro area went to a 14.2% unemployment rate in December 2013. Having since recovered to a rate of 8.7% in April 2018. Some efforts have been directed towards diversifying its economy and are showing a lowering trend in the overall unemployment rate, according to the Bureau of Labor Statistics.

During the Great Recession Merced suffered one of the greatest property price collapses in the country and house prices at the end of 2009 had fallen to 1998 levels, according to Zillow, making housing affordable compared to many other California locations.

The economy has traditionally relied upon agribusiness and upon the presence of Castle Air Force Base. Over the past twenty years, more diversified industry has entered the area, including printing, fiberglass boat building, warehousing and distribution, and packaging industries.

In September 1995, Castle Air Force Base closed after phasing down over the previous three years. This affected residential real estate and some sectors of the retail and service economies, but overall retail continued to increase. Industrial development is increasing in the area. It is now known as the Castle Airport Aviation and Development Center. The Castle Air Museum remains at the site.

Transportation

Major highways
 State Route 59
 State Route 99
 State Route 140

Air 
 Merced Regional Airport offers passenger service provided by Advanced Air, offering daily flights to Las Vegas International Airport (LAS) and Los Angeles International Airport (LAX.)
 Castle Airport in nearby Atwater, California.

Bus
 Greyhound, Intercalifornias, TUFESA and Fronteras del Norte serve Merced.
 YARTS provides scheduled service into Yosemite National Park.
 Merced County Transit, "The Bus", operates both regularly scheduled fixed route bus service and Dial-A-Ride (demand response) transportation services throughout Merced County.
 CatTracks is UC Merced's bus service, which connects students, staff and faculty at the university to off-campus apartments, the off-campus Castle facilities, local amenities, the Amtrak station, and the downtown area. CatTracks also has a live map.

Rail
 Amtrak San Joaquins provides passenger service.

High-speed rail 

The California High-Speed Rail Authority February 2016 draft business plan, outlined the Merced station as not beginning service at the same time as the initial San Jose to Bakersfield route in 2025, but would likely open in 2029 instead. This would make the leg between the Central Valley and Pacheco Pass the first to be constructed. The Merced City Council vigorously opposed the delay in their city's station opening, noting Merced's volume of commuters seeking high-speed rail to access jobs in Silicon Valley. In response, the April 2016 revisions to the business plan indeed included Merced in the initial construction segment, initially as a single-track spur connecting only to the westbound track to the Bay Area, with build out of the full Wye happening later. The system will run from San Francisco to the Los Angeles basin in under three hours at speeds capable of over 200 miles per hour. In August 2022, the CAHSRA announced that it had received a $25,000,000 RAISE Grant to advance design work from Madera to Merced.

Sample trips in the California High Speed rail would include:
 Merced to Fresno - 30 minutes
 Merced to Sacramento – 43 minutes
 Merced to San Jose – 45 minutes
 Merced to San Francisco – 1 hour and 15 minutes
 Merced to Los Angeles – 1 hour and 40 minutes
Altamont Corridor Express Extension

The ACE regional rail system is pursuing an extension to Merced as a part of its broader Altamont Corridor Vision plan. The Final Environmental Impact Report for the Ceres-Merced extension was approved on December 3, 2021.

Geography

A major groundwater plume containing the contaminant PCE was discovered in Merced in 1987. Subsequently, drilling of new water wells was severely restricted.

Climate
Merced has a cold semi-arid climate (Köppen: BSk), with its annual precipitation falling just short of a mediterranean climate. The city features very hot, dry summers and mild, wet winters.

Notes

Economy

Top employers
According to the city's Official Website the top employers in the city are:

In the summer of 2014, the Castle Commerce Center's call center closed, subtracting 400 jobs from AT&T's share of employment.

Agriculture 
Merced is ranked as the sixth-top producing county in California. In 2019, Merced County generated $3.271 billion in total value of production. The top five commodities from 2019 in Merced are:

Education

Merced is home to a community college, Merced College and the University of California Merced. UC Merced now enrolls 8,321 undergraduate and 772 graduate students for a total of 9,093 students, as reported in the university's fall 2021 census. Of the 2021-2022 undergraduate degrees awarded, the top degrees were: 19% Biological Sciences, 16% Psychology, 11% Management, and 10% Computer Science Engineering. The University of California, Merced campus opened in late 2005 northeast of the city limits. UC Merced enrolled about 7,967 students during the 2017–2018 academic year. Merced is served by the Merced City School District, which has five main middle schools, Cruickshank Middle School, Herbert Hoover Middle School, Rivera Middle School, Weaver Middle School and Tenaya Middle School. There are also 14 elementary schools in this district. Merced Union High School District has three major public high school campuses, Merced High School, Golden Valley High School, and El Capitan High School as well as a few smaller campuses offering alternative education. Merced's community college, Merced College, has an enrollment of 8,996 students as of January 2021.

Health

Mercy Medical Center Merced. A 2016 Community Health Assessment prepared by the Merced County Department of Public Health (MCDPH), determined that top health topics that affect Merced and Merced county are heart disease and stroke; diabetes; access to health care; and drug and alcohol abuse. In 2017 the MCDPH published the Merced County Community Health Improvement Plan in an effort to "address health disparities and to promote health equity with the goal of health and wellness for all county residents."

Demographics

2020
The Decennial Census of Population and Housing reported that the population in 2021 was  89,308. In 2021, the average income of an individual was $21,518, and for a household $49,973.

2010
The 2010 United States Census reported that Merced had a population of 78,959. The population density was 3,386.4 people per square mile. (1,307.5/km2). The racial makeup of Merced was 41,177 (52.1%) White, 4,958 (6.3%) African American, 1,153 (1.5%) Native American, 9,342 (11.8%) Asian, 174 (0.2%) Pacific Islander, 17,804 (22.5%) from other races, and 4,350 (5.5%) from two or more races. Hispanic or Latino of any race were 39,140 persons (49.6%).

The Census reported that 77,878 people (98.6% of the population) lived in households, 492 (0.6%) lived in non-institutionalized group quarters, and 588 (0.7%) were institutionalized.

There were 24,899 households, out of which 11,484 (46.1%) had children under the age of 18 living in them, 10,958 (44.0%) were opposite-sex married couples living together, 4,921 (19.8%) had a female householder with no husband present, 1,941 (7.8%) had a male householder with no wife present. There were 2,156 (8.7%) unmarried opposite-sex partnerships, and 167 (0.7%) same-sex married couples or partnerships. 5,356 households (21.5%) were made up of individuals, and 1,823 (7.3%) had someone living alone who was 65 years of age or older. The average household size was 3.13. There were 17,820 families (71.6% of all households); the average family size was 3.65.

The population was spread out, with 25,091 people (31.8%) under the age of 18, 10,475 people (13.3%) aged 18 to 24, 20,986 people (26.6%) aged 25 to 44, 15,484 people (19.6%) aged 45 to 64, and 6,922 people (8.8%) who were 65 years of age or older. The median age was 28.1 years. For every 100 females, there were 96.3 males. For every 100 females age 18 and over, there were 93.6 males.

The homeowner vacancy rate was 3.5%; the rental vacancy rate was 8.5%. 31,690 people (40.1% of the population) lived in owner-occupied housing units and 46,188 people (58.5%) lived in rental housing units.

2000

As of the census of 2000, there were 63,893 people, 20,435 households, and 14,631 families residing in the city. The racial makeup of the city was 57.4% White, 6.3% African American, 1.3% Native American, 12.4% Asian (mostly Hmong), 0.2% Pacific Islander, 23.2% from other races, and 5.2% from two or more races. Hispanic or Latino of any race were 26.4% of the population.

There were 20,435 households, out of which 42.9% had children under the age of 18 living with them, 47.2% contained married couples living together, 18.2% had a female householder with no husband present, and 28.4% were "nonfamilies." 22.6% of all households were made up of individuals, and 8.5% had someone living alone who was 65 years of age or older. The average household size was 3.06 and the average family size was 3.62.

In the city, the population was spread out, with 34.7% under the age of 18, 11.4% from 18 to 24, 27.4% from 25 to 44, 17.1% from 45 to 64, and 9.4% who were 65 years of age or older. The median age was 28 years. For every 100 females, there were 95.6 males. For every 100 females age 18 and over, there were 92.3 males.

The median income for a household in the city was $30,429, and the median income for a family was $32,470. Males had a median income of $31,725 versus $24,492 for females. The per capita income for the city was $13,115. About 22.4% of families and 27.9% of the population were below the poverty line, including 36.9% of those under age 18 and 10.1% of those age 65 or over.

Hmong community

Escaping persecution from Communist forces after the Laotian Civil War, Hmong refugees from Laos moved to the United States in the 1970s and '80s, first settling in Merced and other areas in the Central Valley of California. The Hmong could not initially take part in farming like they had expected, as the land was owned by other people. They could not get high end agricultural jobs because they did not speak sufficient English and Mexican migrants already held low end agricultural jobs. As such, a great many of Merced's Hmong collected social services and Hmong gangs arose, prompting other residents to perceive them as being the cause of economic troubles. As the Hmong settlement matured and the Hmong children gained English language skills, the town's overall attitude began to be more accepting of the Hmong community.

This acceptance is reflected in various services provided to the Hmong community. This includes the Merced Lao Family Community Inc., a nonprofit organization that provides social services to Hmong people, the Merced Department of Public Health's MATCH (Multidisciplinary Approach to Cross-Cultural Health) program, intending to draw Hmong patients into the health care system, a body of Hmong-speaking faculty and paraprofessionals (including college classes on Hmong culture and language), and media outlets for the Hmong community—cable television channel Channel 11 broadcasts programming to the Hmong community twice per week and radio station KBIF 900 AM airs programming oriented towards Hmong people.

While Merced has historically had a proportionally large portion of Hmong (in 1997, 12,000 of Merced's 61,000 residents were Hmong), demographic shifts have reduced this. The Personal Responsibility and Work Opportunity Act of 1996 prompted a move of some Hmong to Minnesota, North Carolina, and Wisconsin. More recently, many Hmong have gone to Alaska to work in crabbing and fishing industries that require little proficiency in English.

Racial demographics
In 2010, Latinos became a majority population in Merced and Merced County as the agricultural industry brought in migrant farm laborers. The area's affordable housing prices attracted both Latino and Asian immigrants. Merced has large Asian-American (e.g. Hmong, followed by Chinese, Vietnamese, Laotian, Cambodian, Filipino, Thai, Korean and Asian Indian) populations relative to the city and county's population size.

Crime 
In 2021, Merced, California had approximately 4,000 violent crimes occur within the city. This means that with a population of 89,303 people in 2021 you had approximately a 4.5% chance of being a victim of crime while living in Merced. Of the crimes that occurred, roughly 1200 where crimes against people and 2500 were crimes against property. The crimes occurring in 2021 resulted in 13 fatalities. With the high crime rate occurring Merced, Merced is considered one of the 50 most dangerous cities to live in California.

Government

Sports
UC Merced Bobcats: softball and other athletic programs. Merced High School and Golden Valley High School sponsor athletics as well.

Merced has a history of minor league baseball including the California League Merced Bears (1940s) and Atwater Angels (1970s) in nearby Atwater, California. There were the defunct Merced Black Bears of the Horizon Air Summer Series and the current Atwater Aviators of the Golden State Collegiate Baseball League.

Notable people

 Lloyd Allen, MLB pitcher
 Ray Allen, NBA player
 Jeff Ball, MLB player
 Summer Bartholomew, Miss California USA 1975, Miss USA 1975
 Michael Basinger, NFL player for the Green Bay Packers
 Bruce Bowen, NBA player for the San Antonio Spurs
 Jim Brewer, MLB pitcher
 Tom Cable, NFL player and coach, former head coach of Oakland Raiders
 Diana Serra Cary, child actress known as "Baby Peggy", writer, silent film historian and advocate for child actors
 Alfonso Ocampo Chavez, MLS player for Seattle Sounders FC 
 Margaret Dingeldein, member of women's US Olympic water polo team at 2004 Athens Olympics
 Tommy Duncan, singer with Bob Wills and Texas Playboys, buried in Merced
 Marvin Eastman, mixed martial arts fighter
 Doug Fister, MLB player for the Washington Nationals
 John Flinn, MLB player for the Baltimore Orioles and Milwaukee Brewers
 Dylan Floro, MLB player for the Miami Marlins
 Brian Fuentes, MLB player for six teams
 Katie Gallagher, finalist on reality television show Survivor: Palau
 Jerry Garvin, MLB pitcher for the Toronto Blue Jays
 Jalen Green, NBA player for the Houston Rockets, selected 2nd overall in the 2021 Draft
 Dave Henderson, MLB player for five teams
 Salar Kamangar, Former CEO of YouTube, founding member of Google's product team
 Philip H. Lathrop, Emmy-winning, Oscar-nominated cinematographer
 Janet Leigh, actress, star of Psycho (1960) by Alfred Hitchcock
 Gerald Madkins, NBA player and executive
 Blas Minor, MLB pitcher
 Bill Mooneyham, MLB player for the Oakland Athletics
 Demi Moore, actress, lived briefly in Merced
 Dwayne Murphy, MLB player for the Oakland Athletics
 Charles Ogletree, Harvard Law School professor, and public intellectual
 Curtis Partch, MLB player for the Cincinnati Reds
 Mari-Lynn Poskin, member of the Kansas House of Representatives
 Chris Pritchett, MLB player
 Peter Rojas, Founder of Engadget
 Dusty Ryan, MLB player for the New York Mets
 Daniel Silva, best-selling novelist
 Tony Slaton, NFL player for the Los Angeles Rams and Dallas Cowboys
 Cary Stayner, serial killer
 Steven Stayner, kidnap victim
 Rowena Granice Steele (1824–1901), American performer, editor, publisher
 Joyce Sumbi (1935-2010), African-American librarian
 Thad Tillotson, MLB player for the New York Yankees
 Rick Williams, MLB pitcher for the Houston Astros

See also 

 Merced County, California
 California Historical Landmarks in Merced County

References and notes

External links

 
 UC Merced
 The Merced Sun-Star
 The Merced County Times

 
1889 establishments in California
Cities in Merced County, California
County seats in California
Incorporated cities and towns in California
Populated places established in 1889